Kenny Hutchinson (born December 13, 1963) is an American former basketball player. He emerged as a top college prospect while playing basketball in New York City at Benjamin Franklin High School and Martin Luther King Jr. High School. While playing at Franklin, Hutchinson was part of a star line-up alongside Richie Adams, Gary Springer and Walter Berry. He won a state championship in 1982 before the school closed down that same year. Hutchinson transferred to King for his final year, where he was named a second-team Parade All-American in 1983. During his high school years, he was an avid streetball basketball player at Rucker Park participating in the Entertainer's Basketball Classic.

Hutchinson was recruited by the defending NCAA champions NC State, but he elected to enrol at the University of Arkansas to play for the Razorbacks. Hutchinson did not originally qualify for a scholarship but eventually made the team in 1984. Though naturally a point guard, Hutchinson played as a shooting guard at Arkansas. Cocaine abuse cut down his time as a player as he tested positive for the drug twice during his time at the school. Hutchinson was a walk-on during his redshirt junior season in 1986–87. He was not selected in the 1987 NBA draft.

References

Living people
1963 births
African-American basketball players
American men's basketball players
Arkansas Razorbacks men's basketball players
Basketball players from New York (state)
Point guards
Shooting guards
Street basketball players
21st-century African-American people
20th-century African-American sportspeople